The 27th Metro Manila Film Festival was held in Manila, Philippines starting December 25, 2001 to January 3, 2002.

Award-winning actor Cesar Montano, newcomer Assunta de Rossi and the film Yamashita: The Tiger's Treasure topped the 2001 Metro Manila Film Festival. Montano and De Rossi took home the Best Actor and Best Actress awards for their performances in the films Bagong Buwan and Hubog respectively. Bagong Buwan and Hubog made it to the top three Best Picture honors. Nevertheless, MAQ Productions' Yamashita: The Tiger's Treasure still leads the awards which won a total of eleven awards including the Best Picture and Best Director for Chito Rono among others. de Rossi's younger sister, Alessandra de Rossi was named Best Supporting Actress for Hubog, while Ronnie Lazaro received the Best Supporting Actor award for Bagong Buwan. The latter film also received five other awards including the Best Child Performer for Jiro Manio, Second Best Picture and the recipient of Gatpuno Antonio J. Villegas Cultural Award.

Entries

Winners and nominees

Awards
Winners are listed first and highlighted in boldface.

Multiple awards

Ceremony Information

Disappointment towards the Best Picture
During the "Gabi ng Parangal" held at the PICC Plenary Hall on December 27, Cesar Montano, while receiving the Best Actor award, expressed his disappointment that his film, Bagong Buwan did not win the Best Picture award. He states: "For me, Bagong Buwan is still the best picture. No offense meant, but for others, Yamashita may be the best picture.  (To each his own. We just don't have a trophy. We'll just buy one in Recto)", referring to a strip on C.M. Recto Avenue in Manila notorious for manufacturing fake diplomas, certificates and trophies.

Box Office gross
Final figures as of January 3, 2002.

References

External links

Metro Manila Film Festival
MMFF
MMFF